Sheikh Humaydi Daham al-Hadi (also Hamidi Daham al-Hadi and Hmeidi Daham al-Jarba; , 1936 – 10 November 2022) was the leader of the Arab tribe of Shammar in Syria.

Biography
Al-Hadi al-Jarba was born in Tall Ulu al-Ula, al-Hasakah Governorate in 1936, to Daham ibn al-Hadi ibn al-Assi al-Jarba (1890–1976), who was the leader of Shammar tribe and a member in the People's Assembly of Syria.

In 2014, he was given a role described variously as co-president and co-governor of Jazira canton of Rojava in northern Syria. He has actively promoted the campaign against ISIL, and has been a severe critic of Wahhabism.

His son Bandar al-Humaydi is military leader of al-Sanadid Forces.

He chaired a meeting of Arab tribal representatives in August 2017 that resulted in the foundation of the Democratic Conservative Party. He was subsequently chosen as the party's first secretary general. In March 2019, he traveled from northern Syria to Damascus, the Khmeimim Air Base and Baghdad for talks with Syrian, Russian and Iraqi officials. The visit was seen as a sign of his willingness to abandon the PKK in favour of the Syrian government.

On 10 November 2022, he died at hospital in Erbil, aged 86.

References 

1936 births
2022 deaths
Qahtanites
People from Al-Hasakah Governorate